Stuart Legg (31 August 1910-23 July 1988) was a pioneering documentary filmmaker. At the 14th Academy Awards in 1941, Legg's National Film Board of Canada film Churchill's Island became the first-ever documentary to win an Oscar. Also in contention for Best Documentary that year was Legg's film Warclouds in the Pacific.

Biography
Francis Stuart Legg was one of three children born to Ethel Green Legg and Arthur Legg, a solicitor. In 1929, after graduating from Cambridge University with a degree in engineering, Legg was hired as an assistant to director Walter Creighton at Publicity Films. For Creighton, he made two films, and met John Grierson, who would become his mentor and life-long friend and colleague.  

Grierson had recently returned from studying in the U.S., where he had become very active in the film world. He saw a lack of public engagement and knowledge of events as contributing to threats to democracy, and saw documentary films as an art-form which could also keep the public informed and involved. He founded the Documentary Film Movement, and recruited several young filmmakers, including Legg. At the time, Grierson was a films officer at the Empire Marketing Board, a government agency which had been formed to encourage trade and national unity. Legg's first film for Grierson was The New Generation (1932), which was said to "exemplify an attempt at the Russian technique." In 1933, the Empire Marketing Board was dissolved and the film unit was moved to the General Post Office. Legg would stay with the GPO Film Unit until 1937, when he replaced Paul Rotha as head of the Strand Film Company. At this time, he was commissioned, by the British Film Council, to write the report Money Behind the Screen.

In 1938, the government of Canada invited Grierson to examine the country’s film production system. In 1939, he was invited back and became the first Commissioner of the National Film Board.  He brought Legg to Canada to make two films whose purpose was to promote the Dominion-Provincial Youth Training Program. The films, The Case of Charlie Gordon and Youth Is Tomorrow, are regarded as milestone in the development of a mature, socially responsible documentary movement in Canada.
 
Legg decided to stay in Canada, and became Director of Production for the Canadian Government Motion Picture Bureau. In this role, he was responsible for the training of filmmakers; when the Bureau and the NFB merged in 1941, he was responsible for 55 filmmakers; a year later, it was 293.

With Canada at war, Legg’s propagandistic style was a perfect fit for the morale-boosting films that the NFB wanted to produce; he was given control of the theatrical shorts program, which included two series: Canada Carries On and The World in Action. Records are incomplete but it is thought that, from 1941 to 1945, he produced and directed most of the films in these series; he is credited with 46. His assistant and researcher was Tom Daly, who would become the NFB's most prolific producer.
 
The World in Action, which began in 1942, appeared each month in 800 Canadian theatres, reaching 4 million viewers; in the U.S., it screened in 6,500 theatres and reached millions. At the end of the war, it was cancelled but Grierson felt that it was commercially viable. He resigned from the NFB and convinced Legg to join him in New York, where he was able to reach a production deal with Universal Pictures. Grierson’s reputation was temporarily damaged when he was caught up in the Gouzenko Affair and accused of being a spy; the deal with Universal was cancelled and, in 1946, Legg returned to England.

In 1940 the GPO Film Unit had become the Crown Film Unit and Legg spent three years there as a producer. In 1952, the British government dissolved the Crown Film Unit and Legg became chairman of Film Centre International, a production coordination company which Grierson had founded in 1937. Through Film Centre, Legg produced films for Gaumont-British Instructional and the Shell Film Unit. Records are incomplete, but it is thought that, between 1952 and 1962, he also produced promotional films for Shell-Mex and BP, Imperial Airways, Anglo-Scottish Pictures and the Australian National Film Board. He retired in 1962.

Writing
After retiring from filmmaking, Legg published four books: Trafalgar : An Eye-Witness Account of a Great Battle (1966), Jutland: An Eye-witness Account of a Great Battle (1967), The Heartland (1970, dedicated to Grierson and re-issued in 1991 as The Barbarians of Asia), and The Railway Book: An Anthology (1988).

Personal life and death
Legg was married to Margaret Amos (1910–2002), daughter of Sir Percy Maurice Amos. They lived at Shooter's Hill, London and had a farm in Lamberhurst, Kent, which may have been Legg's studio.  They had three children, including Sir Thomas Legg. Legg died in Wiltshire in 1988.

Filmography

First Films
Aunt Matilda's Nephew - short film, Cambridge University Film Society 1929 - director
Varsity - short film, Cambridge University Film Society 1930 - director 
Power - short film, Cambridge University Film Society 1930 - director
Windjammer - feature, Gaumont-British Instructional, John Orton 1930 - assistant director
Cambridge - short film, Gaumont-British Instructional 1931 - director 

GPO Film Unit
The New Generation - documentary short, Gaumont-British Instructional 1932 - director
Cable Ship - documentary short, GPO Film Unit, Alexander Shaw 1933 - co-producer with John Grierson
Telephone Workers - documentary short, GPO Film Unit 1933 - director 
Pett and Pott - short film, GPO Film Unit, Alberto Cavalcanti 1934 - co-associate director with Basil Wright, co-writer with Alberto Cavalcanti
Conquering Space: The Story of Modern Communication - documentary short, GPO Film Unit 1934 - producer and director
The New Operator - training film, GPO Film Unit 1934 - director
Savings Bank - documentary short, GPO Film Unit 1934 - director 
C.T.O. - The Story of the Central Telegraph Office - documentary short, GPO Film Unit 1935 - producer 
The Coming of the Dial - documentary short, GPO Film Unit 1935 - co-director with Alexander Shaw 
Coal Face - documentary short, GPO Film Unit 1935 - cinematographer
Yugoslavia - documentary short, GPO Film Unit 1935 - director 
BBC: The Voice of Britain - documentary, GPO Film Unit 1935 - writer, co-producer, director 
Daisy Bell Comes to Town - documentary short, Gaumont-British Instructional, J.B. Holmes 1937 - producer 
Roadways - documentary short, GPO Film Unit, 1937 - co-director with William Coldstream

Strand Film Company
Eastern Valley - documentary short, Strand Film Company, 1937 - producer 
Today We Live - documentary short, Strand Film Company, Ruby Grierson & Ralph Bond 1937 - writer  
Watch and Ward in the Air - documentary short, Strand Film Company, Ralph Keene 1937 - producer
Children’s Story - documentary short, Strand Film Company, Alexander Shaw 1938 - producer 
Animal Legends - documentary, Animal Kingdom Series, Strand Film Company, Alexander Shaw 1938 - producer
Monkey into Man - documentary, Animal Kingdom Series, Strand Film Company, Donald Alexander, Stanley Hawes & Evelyn Spice Cherry 1938 - producer 
Mites and Monsters - documentary, Animal Kingdom Series, Strand Film Company, Donald Alexander 1938 - producer 
Behind the Scenes - documentary short, Animal Kingdom Series, Strand Film Company, Evelyn Spice Cherry 1938 - producer 
Fingers and Thumbs - documentary short, Animal Kingdom Series, Strand Film Company, Evelyn Spice Cherry 1938 - producer 
Birth of the Year, or Spring at the Zoo - documentary short, Animal Kingdom Series, Strand Film Company, Evelyn Spice Cherry 1938 - producer  
Free to Roam - documentary short, Animal Kingdom Series, Strand Film Company 1938 - producer, and co-director with Paul Burnford
Zoo Babies - documentary short, Animal Kingdom Series, Strand Film Company, Evelyn Spice Cherry 1938 - producer
The Zoo and You - documentary short, Animal Kingdom Series, Strand Film Company, Ruby Grierson 1938 - producer 
The Duchy of Cornwall - documentary short, Strand Film Company, Bill Pollard 1938 - producer
Wealth of a Nation - documentary short, Strand Film Company, Bill Pollard 1938 - producer  
Wings Over Empire - documentary short, Strand Film Company 1938 - director
Land of the White Rhino - documentary short, Strand Film Company, Ruby Grierson and Donald Alexander 1939 - producer
Animals on Guard - documentary short, Strand Film Company, Ruby Grierson and Donald Alexander 1939 - producer
Animal Geography - documentary short, Strand Film Company, Ruby Grierson and Donald Alexander 1939 - producer

National Film Board of Canada

The Case of Charlie Gordon - documentary short 1939 - writer, director
Youth is Tomorrow - documentary short 1939 - writer, director
Atlantic Patrol - documentary short 1940 - writer, editor, producer, director
Toilers of the Grand Banks - documentary short 1940 - producer, director
Letter from Camp Borden - documentary short, Raymond Spottiswoode 1940 - producer
Wings of Youth - documentary short, Raymond Spottiswoode 1940 - producer
Letter from Aldershot - documentary short, John Taylor 1940 - producer
The Front of Steel - documentary short, John McDougall 1940 - producer
''Children from Overseas - documentary short, Ruby Grierson & Stanley Hawes 1940 - producer
Churchill's Island - documentary short 1941 - writer, editor, producer, director
Battle of Brains - documentary short, Stanley Hawes 1941 - producer
Food - Weapon of Conquest - documentary short 1941 - writer, editor, producer, director
Warclouds in the Pacific - documentary short 1941 - writer, editor, producer, director
Soldiers All - documentary short 1941 - producer, director
Strategy of Metals - documentary short, Raymond Spottiswoode 1941 - writer, editor, producer
Wings of a Continent - documentary short, Raymond Spottiswoode 1941 - writer, producer
Everywhere in the World - documentary short 1941 - producer, director
Heroes of the Atlantic - documentary short, J.D. Davidson 1941 - writer
Inside Fighting China - documentary short 1942 - writer, editor, producer, director
The Mask of Nippon - documentary short, Margaret Palmer 1942 - writer, producer
Invasion of North Africa - documentary short, Strand Film Company 1942 - co-director with Stanley Hawes 
Ferry Pilot - documentary short 1942 - director and, with Ross McLean, co-producer
Great Lakes - documentary short, Radford Crawley & Donald Fraser 1942 - executive producer
Inside Fighting Russia - documentary short 1942 - producer, director
This is Blitz - documentary short 1942 - writer, editor, producer, director
The Battle for Oil - documentary short 1942 - writer, editor, director
Geopolitik: Hitler’s Plan for Empire - documentary short 1942 - writer, editor, producer, director
Battle Is Their Birthright - documentary short 1943 - writer, editor, producer, director
Fighting Dutch - documentary short, Raymond Spottiswoode 1943 - producer
The Gates of Italy - documentary short, 1943 - writer, editor, director and, with Tom Daly, co-producer
The War for Men's Minds - documentary 1943 - writer, editor, producer, director
Battle of Europe - documentary short 1944 - writer, editor, director and, with Tom Daly, co-producer
Zero Hour - documentary short 1944 - producer, director
Balkan Powder Keg - documentary short 1944 - writer, editor, producer, director
Future for Fighters - documentary short 1944 - writer James Beveridge, co-director, co-producer
When Asia Speaks - documentary short, Gordon Weisenborn 1944 - writer, editor, producer
Fortress Japan - documentary short 1944 - writer, editor, producer, director
Our Northern Neighbour - documentary short, Tom Daly 1944 - producer
Inside France - documentary short 1944 - writer, editor, producer, co-director, with Tom Daly
Global Air Routes - documentary short 1944 - writer, editor, producer, director
Food: Secret of the Peace - documentary short 1945 - writer, editor, producer, director
Spotlight on the Balkans - documentary short 1945 - producer, director
Maps in Action - documentary short 1945 - producer, director
John Bull's Own Island - documentary short 1945 - writer, editor, producer, director
Now — The Peace - documentary short 1945 - writer, editor, producer, director
Tomorrow’s Citizens - documentary short, Gordon Weisenborn 1947 - writer, producer

Crown Film Unit
From the Ground Up - documentary short, Crown Film Unit, 1950 - producer 
Men of the World - documentary short, Crown Film Unit, Ronald Clark 1950 - producer 
Eagles of the Fleet - documentary short, Crown Film Unit, Cyril Frankel 1950 - producer 
Underwater Story - documentary short Crown Film Unit, Cyril Frankel 1950 - producer, co-writer with Cyril Frankel 
Spotlight on the Colonies - documentary short, Crown Film Unit, Diana Pine 1950 - producer
Forward a Century - documentary short, Crown Film Unit, Napier Bell 1951 - producer 
Operation Hurricane - documentary short, Crown Film Unit, Ronald Stark 1952 - producer

Film Centre International
Plan for Coal - documentary short 1953 - producer 
Powered Flight: The Story of the Century - documentary, 1953 - director
Focus on India - documentary short, Gaumont-British Instructional 1953 - writer, director 
Focus on Pakistan - documentary short, Gaumont-British Instructional 1953 - writer, director 
Focus on Flying Boats - documentary short, Gaumont-British Instructional 1954 - writer, director
Golden Reef - documentary short, Worldwide Pictures, Julian Spiro 1956 - producer 
The Rival World aka Strijd Zonder Einde - documentary short, Shell Film Unit, Bert Haanstra 1955 - producer 
Song of the Clouds - documentary short, John Armstrong, Shell Film Unit 1957 - producer 
Food or Famine - documentary short, Shell Film Unit, co-producer and  -director with Martha Varley and A. Bailey 1962

Legacy
Legg's film Churchill's Island was preserved by the Academy Film Archive in 2005.

References

Notes

Citations

Bibliography

 Ellis, Jack C. John Grierson: Life, Contributions, Influence. Carbondale, Illinois: Southern Illinois University Press, 2000. .
 Evans, Gary. John Grierson and the National Film Board: The Politics of Wartime Propaganda. Toronto: University of Toronto Press, 1984. .
 Khouri, Malek. Filming Politics: Communism and the Portrayal of the Working Class at the National Film Board of Canada, 1939-46. Calgary, Alberta, Canada: University of Calgary Press, 2007. .
 McInnes, Graham. One Man's Documentary: A Memoir of the Early Years of the National Film Board. Winnipeg, Manitoba: University of Manitoba, 2004. .

External links
 BFI Screenonline biography
 Film Reference Library biography
 
 Watch films by Stuart Legg at NFB.ca

1910 births
1988 deaths
British documentary filmmakers
British documentary film producers
National Film Board of Canada people
British expatriates in Canada